Ocean Under the Ice is a science fiction novel by Robert L. Forward, collaborating with his wife, Martha Dodson Forward. It is part of the Rocheworld series, about an expedition to explore planets found in orbit around Barnard's Star.  It was written after Marooned on Eden, but is before it in the continuity.  This is the third book in the continuity. It follows the crew of humans and Flouwen as they explore Zulu, a moon of the gas planet Gargantua, and encounter 2 sentient species, the icerugs and the coelasharks.

References

External links 

1994 science fiction novels
American science fiction novels
Fiction set around Barnard's Star
1994 American novels
Novels set on fictional planets
Novels by Robert L. Forward